Ericeia biplagiella is a moth in the family Erebidae. It is found in northern Madagascar.

References
Viette, P. 1966c. Noctuelles quadrifides de Madagascar nouvelles ou peu connues, II (Lep. Noctuidae). - Bulletin de la Société entomologique de France 71:140–152, pl. 1.

Moths described in 1966
Moths of Madagascar
Moths of Africa
Ericeia